Camp Lapwai was a United States Army encampment in Washington Territory, present-day Idaho. It was established by Company E, 1st Regiment Washington Territory Volunteer Infantry.  After being mustered in at Alcatraz at San Francisco, California, they were ordered on October 19, 1862, to Camp Lapwai near the Nez Perce Agency. Joined there at the beginning of November by Company "F", 1st Oregon Volunteer Cavalry Regiment, they built the encampment. Camp Lapwai was renamed Fort Lapwai in 1863; the new Idaho Territory was also established in 1863.

Garrisons
 Company E, 1st Regiment Washington Territory Volunteer Infantry October, October 1862 - June 1864
 Company "F", 1st Oregon Volunteer Cavalry Regiment, November, 1862 - May 1865.

See also
 Fort Lapwai
 Lapwai, Idaho
 Nez Perce people

References

Lapwai
Closed installations of the United States Army
Lapwai
Buildings and structures in Nez Perce County, Idaho
Idaho in the American Civil War
1862 establishments in Washington Territory